Grover Beach is a city in San Luis Obispo County, California, United States. The population was 13,156 at the 2010 census, up from 13,067 in 2000. Grover Beach is the location of the Pacific Crossing cable Landing station. This is where trans-pacific submarine cables come ashore and interface with the North American telecom network.

History
Grover Beach was originally known as Town of Grover, which was founded on August 1, 1887. The town was named for its founder, D.W. Grover.

Grover filed his plans at the San Luis Obispo County Court House and eventually founded what was to be known as City of Grover City. There was a popular vote that allowed incorporating on December 21, 1959, as City of Grover City. However, the name seemed redundant so some people sought better names, especially ocean-oriented names. In 1992, there was another popular vote, in which the town's name was officially changed from "City of Grover City" to "Grover Beach" to emphasize the seaside location.

Geography
Grover Beach is part of the 5 Cities Metropolitan Area.  The "5 Cities" includes 3 cities; Grover Beach, Pismo Beach, and Arroyo Grande along with Oceano and Shell Beach (part of Pismo Beach). The city extends from Arroyo Grande in the east to Pismo State Beach.

Climate
This region experiences warm and dry summers, with no average monthly temperatures above 71.6 °F.  According to the Köppen Climate Classification system, Grover Beach has a warm-summer Mediterranean climate, abbreviated "Csb" on climate maps.

Demographics

2010
At the 2010 census Grover Beach had a population of 13,156. The racial makeup of Grover Beach was 9,964 (75.7%) White, 146 (1.1%) African American, 186 (1.4%) Native American, 542 (4.1%) Asian, 35 (0.3%) Pacific Islander, 1,582 (12.0%) from other races, and 701 (5.3%) from two or more races. Hispanic or Latino of any race were 3,840 persons (29.2%).

The census reported that 12,967 people (98.6% of the population) lived in households, 185 (1.4%) lived in non-institutionalized group quarters, and 4 (0.0%) were institutionalized.

There were 5,111 households, 1,656 (32.4%) had children under the age of 18 living in them, 2,178 (42.6%) were opposite-sex married couples living together, 735 (14.4%) had a female householder with no husband present, 335 (6.6%) had a male householder with no wife present.  There were 428 (8.4%) unmarried opposite-sex partnerships, and 54 (1.1%) same-sex married couples or partnerships. 1,330 households (26.0%) were one person and 439 (8.6%) had someone living alone who was 65 or older. The average household size was 2.54.  There were 3,248 families (63.5% of households); the average family size was 3.04.

The age distribution was 2,928 people (22.3%) under the age of 18, 1,264 people (9.6%) aged 18 to 24, 3,809 people (29.0%) aged 25 to 44, 3,603 people (27.4%) aged 45 to 64, and 1,552 people (11.8%) who were 65 or older.  The median age was 36.9 years. For every 100 females, there were 95.7 males.  For every 100 females age 18 and over, there were 93.6 males.

There were 5,748 housing units at an average density of 2,483.5 per square mile, of the occupied units 2,390 (46.8%) were owner-occupied and 2,721 (53.2%) were rented. The homeowner vacancy rate was 2.0%; the rental vacancy rate was 3.7%.  5,719 people (43.5% of the population) lived in owner-occupied housing units and 7,248 people (55.1%) lived in rental housing units.

2000
At the 2000 census there were 13,067 people in 5,023 households, including 3,305 families, in the city. The racial makeup of the city was 79.75% White, 1.03% African American, 1.69% Native American, 3.75% Asian, 0.30% Pacific Islander, 9.23% from other races, and 4.25% from two or more races. Hispanic or Latino of any race were 22.51%.

Of the 5,023 households 32.8% had children under the age of 18 living with them, 46.9% were married couples living together, 14.1% had a female householder with no husband present, and 34.2% were non-families. 24.6% of households were one person and 8.2% were one person aged 65 or older.  The average household size was 2.58 and the average family size was 3.07.

The age distribution was 25.6% under the age of 18, 9.1% from 18 to 24, 32.0% from 25 to 44, 21.7% from 45 to 64, and 11.5% 65 or older.  The median age was 35 years. For every 100 females, there were 94.1 males.  For every 100 females age 18 and over, there were 89.9 males.

The median household income was $38,087 and the median family income  was $41,859. Males had a median income of $31,045 versus $26,506 for females. The per capita income for the city was $18,812.  About 8.8% of families and 11.3% of the population were below the poverty line, including 12.0% of those under age 18 and 8.1% of those age 65 or over.

Government

Transportation

The Grover Beach Amtrak station is the only train station in the 5 Cities area and is located at the intersection of Grand Avenue and State Highway 1, adjacent to Pismo State Beach. Amtrak buses depart from the stop situated directly across the tracks. San Luis Obispo Regional Transit Authority operates additional bus lines that run from Grover Beach to most cities in San Luis Obispo county, as well as Santa Maria.

References

External links

 Arroyo Grande & Grover Beach Chamber Of Commerce
City-Data.com Comprehensive Statistical Data and more about Grover Beach
San Luis Obispo Regional Transit Authority

1959 establishments in California
Cities in San Luis Obispo County, California
Incorporated cities and towns in California
Populated coastal places in California
Populated places established in 1959